Gidas is an administrative ward in the Babati Rural District of the Manyara Region of Tanzania.

According to the 2002 census, the ward had a total population of 11,288. According to the 2012 census, the ward has a population of 7,392.

References

Wards of Manyara Region